SANAE IV is a current South African Antarctic research base located in Vesleskarvet, Queen Maud Land. The base is part of the South African National Antarctic Program (SANAP) and is operated by the South African National Antarctic Expedition.

The other two SANAP bases are located on the Gough and Marion islands.

Location 
Located in the Queen Maud Land region of Eastern or Greater Antarctica, SANAE IV is on top of a distinctive flat-topped nunatak, Vesleskarvet, on the fringe of the Ahlmann Range of mountains. Vesleskarvet is completely surrounded by the glacial ice sheet.

Concept 
The first three SANAE research stations were located on the Fimbul Ice Shelf near the coast, and were subject to the gradual snow burial and eventual crushing that occurs with all stations constructed in this fashion.  With a vision of creating a more permanent station, SANAE IV was completed in 1997 using a design which was revolutionary at the time - a structure raised on stilts which allows snow to blow through underneath and thus limits deposition.

By constructing the base near the cliffs of Vesleskarvet, the concept was advanced further: snow that would collect downwind of the base and eventually advance to cover it is instead blown off the 250 m high cliffs into the wind-scoop beyond.  By virtue of this feature, the station should far exceed the short useful life of its predecessors, and the raised design has since been applied to newer stations, such as the British Antarctic Survey's new Halley Research Station and Germany's new Neumayer-Station III.

The station has an orange coloured roof for better visibility from the air.  The underside of the station used to be painted in a blue colour which in theory was warmed somewhat by the sun and contributed to reducing the build-up of ice underneath the station.  In 1999 the South African minister of Environment and Tourism decided that this colour scheme is too reminiscent of South Africa's old flag, and ordered the orange roof to be painted bright red.
   Eventually, the roof remained orange and the blue underside was painted orange as well.

Base layout 
Two smaller nearby structures contain the satellite dish used for communications and the diesel fuel bunkers. Joined end-on-end in a north–south orientation, the base modules are complemented on the northern end by a large raised helicopter landing area with a lifting section allowing vehicles to be brought up into the hangar for maintenance.

C-block, the northernmost module, contains the large hangar, generator room, workshop, water storage, sewage processing plant, equipment stores, offices of the mechanical and electrical engineers, flight operations office, gymnasium and sauna.  The neutron monitors of the North-West University are also housed in this area.

B-block, the middle module, contains the kitchen, dining area, two TV lounges, bar, games room, smoker's room, library, a laundry and accommodation units.

A-block, the southern module, contains the radio room and communications hub, medical facility, darkroom, various research project offices, leader's office, two physics labs, wet lab, store-rooms, another laundry, and accommodation units.

The modules are linked by single-story connections that also serve as entrances with stairways down to the surface 4m below the base.  Each link contains an entrance hall with two sets of doors (creating a rudimentary 'air-lock' to prevent excessive cooling when entering and exiting the base) as well as a change-room, ablution facility and electronic distribution boards.

Facilities 

The base generates power using three diesel generators.  Water is generated by manually shovelling snow into a snow smelter, which then melts the snow and ice and pumps water automatically into the holding tanks.  Waste water and sewerage is treated within the base, with the only by-product being clean water which is then released back into the environment.  All refuse is sorted, crushed and sealed in empty fuel drums for return to South Africa.

This is accomplished by three means. Firstly, the heat generated by the diesel generators is used to heat water for the taps and showers, which is then circulated through the base. Secondly, the same generator heat is used to heat air which is distributed by the climate control system. Thirdly, small electric wall and fan heaters are available in all indoor areas.

SANAE IV has advanced communications capabilities using both satellite and radio systems.  A permanent satellite connection to the SANAP headquarters in Cape Town provides three telephone lines and one fax line, and near-broadband internet access.  Team members in Antarctica enjoy fast internet access which allows them to correspond with colleagues and stay in contact with friends and family.

Staff 
The base is staffed and maintained year-round by a team of scientists and support personnel.  Each overwintering team arrives during the summer expedition and take-over period aboard the research and logistics vessel S. A. Agulhas II, stays at the base through the austral winter and returns to South Africa at the end of the next summer season - an expedition of approximately 16 months.  The summer expedition and re-supply team (excluding ship's crew) consists of 80–100 persons, and includes administrative staff, heavy vehicle operators, helicopter crew, maintenance staff, the new overwintering team and a large scientific contingent.  During the brief summer (typically December/January to February/March) the base must be resupplied with food, equipment and fuel, all waste products must be removed for transport back to South Africa, the new overwintering team must receive on-site training, and scientific investigations which cannot be undertaken in the winter months (such as extended field-work) must be completed.

The overwintering team remains at the base alone and isolated between the months of March and December.  To be fully self-sufficient, the team typically consists of the following personnel:
 An electronic engineer who doubles as communications technician,
 A mechanical engineer responsible for the base systems
 An electrical engineer who manages power generation and distribution
 Two diesel mechanics responsible for maintenance of the diesel generators, heavy vehicles and skidoos
 A meteorologist who performs both observations and forecasting
 A cosmic ray physicist/engineer responsible for various research projects
 A high frequency radar physicist/engineer responsible for the auroral radar projects
 A third scientist responsible for the International Polar Year projects and other installations
 A medical doctor

An expedition leader is selected from the overwintering team prior to the departure of the expedition, and a deputy elected to serve in his place should the need arise.  The expedition leader is responsible for administrative tasks and reports to the South African National Antarctic Programme headquarters in South Africa.

Research 
 
SANAE IV's reason for existence is to provide a permanent year-round base for scientists undertaking research projects under the auspices of SANAP.  Investigations carried-out year-round are predominantly in the physical sciences, while the summer months allow research in more diverse fields such as oceanography, biology, geology and geomorphology.  Recent projects have also focused on sources of renewable energy such as solar and particularly wind power generation.  There is not currently any formal medical research being undertaken.

Ongoing physical science research programs includes the Antarctic Magnetospheric and Ionospheric Ground-based Observation (AMIGO), Southern Hemisphere Auroral Radar Experiment (SHARE) and Super Dual Auroral Radar Network (SuperDARN), Antarctic Research on Cosmic Rays (ANOKS), very low frequency (VLF) radio research and various International Polar Year projects.

Detailed information about the research projects may be found under the research section of the SANAP webpage

See also
 List of Antarctic research stations
 List of Antarctic field camps
 List of airports in Antarctica
 List of Antarctic expeditions
 Demographics of Antarctica
 Crime in Antarctica

References

External links 

 South African National Antarctic Programme - Official website
 Facebook Group - SANAE team discussions
 Life of an Antarctic Adventurer - SANAE IV Base

South African National Antarctic Programme
Outposts of Queen Maud Land
Princess Martha Coast
1997 establishments in Antarctica